Articles of Faith usually refers to a creed.

Articles of Faith may also refer to:

Articles of Faith (band), an American hardcore punk band
The Six Articles of Faith in Islam
Articles of Faith (Latter Day Saints), a canonized Latter Day Saint creed
Articles of Faith (Brand), a 2008 book by Russell Brand
Articles of Faith (Talmage), an 1899 book by James E. Talmage
"Articles of Faith" (Dead Zone), an episode of the television series The Dead Zone